The Dukeries Academy (formerly The Dukeries Comprehensive School and then The Dukeries College and Complex) is a secondary school, community college situated in Ollerton, Nottinghamshire.

It offers education for students aged 11–19. ATTFE College, the school's sixth form, also offer a range of level 2 and 3 courses, including GCSEs and BTECs.
Opened in September 1964 as, with Kirkby in Ashfiled Comprehensive School, the first Nottinghamshire County Comprehensives - Fairham Comprehensive School in Nottingham had preceded them, then the School immediately proved to be a high quality "Community Provision" at a time when the village and neighbouring Edwinstowe and Bilsthorpe - who provided young people as pupils at the school -  were thriving mining communities. The School/College/Academy therefore celebrates its 49th  anniversary in 2014.

The Dukeries has been visited by Ed Balls,  Sebastian Coe and Gordon Brown.

Balls described it as "a school of the 21st century". The school received a "satisfactory" grade after an OFSTED inspection.
The school became an academy on 1 January 2013, and was renamed The Dukeries Academy.
The Dukeries offers, a theatre, horse riding, on-site counselling, a construction block (opened in 2008), an astro-turf pitch, a youth club and a fire service training centre.

In 2009, The Dukeries was included in controversial plans to cut funding. Nottinghamshire County Council proposed to cut £380,000 of the schools budget to save money. There is a current campaign underway to stop these cuts from happening.

The attached Leisure Centre (owned by NSDC) received an extension to include a new swimming pool in 2020, and the structure was built and completed in 2021. The pool was officially opened by Olympic gold medalist Rebecca Adlington.

References

Secondary schools in Nottinghamshire
Academies in Nottinghamshire